Juan Pablo García (born October 4, 1987) is a Mexican racing driver.

Racing career

Early career
Garcia began his professional career in Formula Renault 2000 de America in 2006. He made two A1 Grand Prix starts for A1 Team Mexico that winter and then drove in the British Formula 3 Championship National Class, finishing 7th. In 2008 he drove in Formula Renault 2.0 Northern European Cup, finishing 16th, and Formula Renault 2.0 Eurocup where he failed to score.

Indy Lights
In August 2009 he signed on to make his Indy Lights debut for HVM Racing at Infineon Raceway after being inactive for much of the year. He returned to the team in 2010 and made two late-season road course starts, finishing 6th at Infineon. For 2011 he signed to drive full-time in the series for Jensen MotorSport. However, he left the team and the series after the fourth race of the season, the Freedom 100, with a best finish of eighth. He returned to Indy Lights in 2012 racing with the Jeffrey Mark Motorsports team. Garcia finished 9th in points with a best finish of 7th (twice). He returned to the series in 2013 with Team Moore Racing for ten races, switching to Belardi Auto Racing for the final two races of the season. He finished eighth in points with a best finish of fourth in the season opener at St. Petersburg.

Racing record

American open–wheel racing results 
(key)

Indy Lights

References

External links

1987 births
Mexican racing drivers
A1 Team Mexico drivers
Latin America Formula Renault 2000 drivers
Formula Renault 2.0 NEC drivers
Formula Renault Eurocup drivers
British Formula Three Championship drivers
Indy Lights drivers
Living people
HVM Racing drivers
Team Moore Racing drivers
Belardi Auto Racing drivers
Arrow McLaren SP drivers
Fluid Motorsport Development drivers
Motopark Academy drivers